The Nigeria women's national under-20 football team, nicknamed the Falconets, represents Nigeria in international youth women's football competitions. Its primary role is the development of players in preparation for the senior women's national team. The team competes in a variety of competitions, including the biennial FIFA U-20 Women's World Cup and African U-20 Women's World Cup qualification, which is the top competitions for this age group. 

The team has qualified for every edition of the FIFA U-20 Women's World Cup and have been runners-up twice, losing to  Germany on both occasions in 2010 and 2014.

Fixtures and results

 Legend

2022

 Fixtures and results (Nigeria Under 20) – Soccerway.com

Personnel
The coaching squad for the 2022 FIFA U-20 Women's World Cup was announced by the Nigeria Football Federation on 14 August 2022.

Current squad
A 30-player preliminary squad was announced on 25 June 2022. The final squad for the 2022 FIFA U-20 Women's World Cup was announced in August 2022.

Competitive record

FIFA U-20 Women's World Cup record

African U-20 Women's World Cup Qualification record

Football at the African Games record

Honours
Intercontinental
U-20 Women's World Cup
Runners-up: 2010, 2014
Fourth place: 2012

Continental
African U-20 Women's World Cup qualification
Winners: 2002, 2004
Qualified for World Cup:  2006,  2008,  2010,  2012,  2014,  2015,  2018,  2022

Football at the African Games
Gold medalists: 2019

See also
 Nigeria women's national football team

References

 http://dailypost.ng/2015/09/24/falconets-to-depart-for-kinshasa-on-thursday/

External links
 Official Nigeria Football Federation website

under-20
African women's national under-20 association football teams